Yo No Canto, Pero Lo Intentamos is the second studio album by Regional Mexican recording artist Espinoza Paz. It was released on January 26, 2009, by Disa Records.

Track listing
All songs were composed by Espinoza Paz.
Odio Explotar - 2:59
Volveré Muy Pronto - 2:54
Lo Intentamos - 3:17
Cómo Me Das Lástima - 2:48
La Lagartija - 3:26
Resfriado - 3:44
En Cada Mujer - 2:55
Señorita Presumida - 2:36
Ponte En Mi Lugar - 3:23
Madrecita Santa - 2:31

Charts

Weekly charts

Year-end charts

Sales and certifications

See also
List of number-one Billboard Top Latin Albums of 2009

References

Espinoza Paz albums
2009 albums
Disa Records albums